Evan Thomas (born 1951) is an American journalist and author..

Evan Thomas may also refer to:

 Evan Thomas (actor) (1891–1982), Canadian-born British actor
 Evan Thomas (priest) (1872–1953), Welsh clergyman and professor
 Evan Thomas (rugby league), Welsh rugby league player
 Evan Thomas (inventor), Welsh ironmonger, inventor and manufacturer of safety lamps for miners
 Evan Kyffin Thomas (1877–1935), editor and newspaper proprietor in South Australia

See also
 Evan Thomas, Radcliffe and Company, Wales-based shipping company
 Hugh Evan-Thomas (1862–1928), British admiral
 John Evan Thomas (1810–1873), Welsh sculptor
 Leland Evan Thomas (1918–1942), United States Marine Corps pilot